Sven Anders Rutqvist (born 30 August 1958 in Krokom, Jämtland) is a former Swedish Olympic swimmer. He swam in the prelims for the 4×200 m freestyle team in the 1980 Summer Olympics.

Clubs
Mariestads SS

References

1958 births
Living people
Swimmers at the 1980 Summer Olympics
Olympic swimmers of Sweden
Swedish male freestyle swimmers